The 2012 Cardiff Council election took place on Thursday 3 May 2012 to elect members of Cardiff Council in Wales. This was the same day as the national 2012 Welsh local elections. It was preceded by the 2008 election and followed by the 2017 election

Election result
Labour gained control of the council from the Liberal Democrats and Plaid Cymru, after gaining 32 seats. The Liberal Democrat leader of the council, Rodney Berman, lost his seat by 51 votes after two recounts, bringing Labour's gains to 33. Sixty-one-year-old Labour councillor Heather Joyce, nicknamed 'Supernan' by the local newspaper, became the new council leader.

|}
 The consolidated vote figures used in the above table appear to represent the total votes cast for the highest placed candidates in each ward. The figures are not the popular vote cast for each party in the 2012 elections.
 The figures below are the total votes cast for all candidates for each party in the 2012 elections, based on data from The Elections Centre at Plymouth University - Lab: 99,391 (46/75); Con: 45,293 (7/74); LD: 43,418 (16/75); PC: 30,989 (2/70); Rhiwbina Ind: 10,908 (3/3); Green: 8,925 (0/37); Heath Ind: 3,539 (1/3); LN Ind: 1,114 (0/2); Ind: 773 (0/4); TUSC: 456 (0/6); UKIP: 445 (0/2); Communist: 335 (0/4); Christian: 205 (0/3); Socialist Lab: 106 (0/1)

Manifestos
Cardiff Greens

Cardiff Labour

Cardiff Liberal Democrats

Cardiff Plaid Cymru

Ward results

* = sitting councillor in this ward prior to election

Adamsdown (2 seats)

Butetown (1 seat)

Caerau (2 seats)

Canton (3 seats)

Cathays (4 seats)

Creigiau & St. Fagans (1 seat)

Cyncoed (3 seats)

Ely (3 seats)

Fairwater (3 seats)

Gabalfa (2 seats)

Grangetown (3 seats)

Heath (3 seats)
Fenella Bowden, elected as a Liberal Democrat in 2012, stood as a Heath & Birchgrove Independent.

Lisvane (1 seat)

Llandaff (2 seats)

Llandaff North (2 seats)

Llanishen (4 seats)

Llanrumney (3 seats)

Pentwyn (4 seats)

Pentyrch (1 seat)

Penylan (3 seats)

Plasnewydd (4 seats)

Pontprennau and Old St. Mellons (2 seats)

Radyr (1 seat)

Rhiwbina (3 seats)

Riverside (3 seats)

Rumney (2 seats)
Duncan Macdonald had been elected as a Conservative in 2008.

Splott (3 seats)

Trowbridge (3 seats)

Whitchurch and Tongwynlais (4 seats)

By-elections between 2012 and 2017

Riverside

The by-election was caused by the resignation of Labour councillor Phil Hawkins for personal reasons.

Splott

A by-election was caused by the resignation of Labour councillor Luke Holland following accusations of non-attendance at council meetings. He stated that he planned to move to London.

Canton

The by-election was caused by the resignation of Labour Councillor Cerys Furlong on 30 December 2013.

Llandaff North

The by-election was caused by the resignation of Labour councillor Siobhan Corria for personal reasons.

Pentyrch

The by-election was caused by the resignation of Conservative Councillor Craig Williams, following his election as MP for Cardiff North.

Riverside

The by-election was caused by the resignation of Labour councillor Cecilia Love for family reasons.

Plasnewydd

The by-election was caused by the death of Labour councillor Mohammed Javed.

Grangetown

The by-election was caused by the death of Labour councillor Chris Lomax.

Defections 2012–17
In April 2013 Gabalfa Councillor Gareth Holden resigned from The Lib Dems to sit as an independent and later joined Plaid Cymru.
In June 2015 Rhiwbina Councillors Jayne Cowan and Adrian Robson both rejoined the Conservatives.
In January 2016 Trowbridge Councillor Ralph Cook left Labour  to sit as an independent. In 2017 he contested his seat for the Lib Dems.
In May 2016 Llanrumny Councillor Derrick Morgan left the Labour group and sat as an independent.
In August 2016 Splott Councillor Gretta Marshell resigned from Labour to sit as an independent and later joined Plaid Cymru 
In early 2017 Adamsdown Councillor Manzoor Ahmed was deselected by Labour and joined the Lib Dems.

Vacant seats by 2017 local election
Three seats were vacant by the end of the term caused by the resignation of Margaret Jones (Lib Dem) in Cyncoed, the resignation of Susan White (Labour) in Llandaff North and the death of Derrick Morgan (elected as Labour, then sitting as an Independent) in Llanrumny, all of happened within six months of the 2017 election, so no by-elections were held.

References

External links
 2012 Local Council Election , Cardiff Council website

2012 Welsh local elections
2012
2010s in Cardiff